Krazy's Race of Time is a 1937 short animated film distributed by Columbia Pictures, part of a short film series featuring Krazy Kat.

Plot
When traffic becomes a bigger and more dangerous problem, authorities seek for a solution. They solve this by elevating the roads, some of which pass through the tall buildings. They even resort to making every house and building float in the sky.

Some time after the advancements mentioned above, Krazy, who works as a chemist, is working on a special liquid. Upon drinking the liquid from a beaker, Krazy rapidly zooms around like a rocket. Astronomers would use his idea to send him on an exploration trip to the planet Mars. The astronomers place the cat in a real rocket which they launch.

Krazy's rocket lands safely on the red planet. Krazy wonders around the Martian grounds where he notices the local humanoid creatures, and their odd customs. At the end of his journey, Krazy comes across a scary giant whom he tries to befriend. The giant, however, mistakes Krazy for an invader, and therefore attempts to capture the cat. Krazy is able to escape the giant's grasp by drinking a beaker of his special liquid. As Krazy flees the planet in his rocket, the giant starts hurling meteors at him. Krazy manages to fly away without getting hit.

See also
 Krazy Kat filmography

References

External links

1937 short films
American animated short films
American black-and-white films
1937 animated films
Krazy Kat shorts
Columbia Pictures short films
1930s American animated films
Mars in film
Columbia Pictures animated short films
Screen Gems short films